The 1900 Northern Illinois State Normal football team represented Northern Illinois State Normal College as an independent in the 1900 college football season. They were led by second-year head coach John A. H. Keith. The team finished the season with a 2–2–2 record.

Schedule

References

Northern Illinois State
Northern Illinois Huskies football seasons
Northern Illinois State Normal football